Babio in Latin is a 12th-century elegiac comedy  consisting of 484 lines of elegiac distichs, probably composed in England. It imitates Roman comedy and is indebted to Ovid, Plautus and Terence. It is preserved in five manuscripts, four of them in England and one in Berlin (Babio).

Editions
Edmond Faral (1948)
M. M. Brennan, Charleston (1969).

See also
 Medieval theatre
 Medieval Latin comedy

External links
The Influence of Plautus and Latin Elegiac Comedy on Chaucer's Fabliaux by Kathleen A. Bishop

12th-century literature
Comedy plays